Love Music may refer to:

 Love Music (Ali Love album) 
 Love Music (Sérgio Mendes album)